The 1967 All-Southwest Conference football team consists of American football players chosen by various organizations for All-Southwest Conference teams for the 1967 NCAA University Division football season.  The selectors for the 1967 season included the Associated Press (AP).

All Southwest selections

Offense

Quarterbacks
 Edd Hargett, Texas A&M (AP-1)

Halfbacks
 Chris Gilbert, Texas (AP-1) (CHFOF)
 Mike Leinert, Texas Tech (AP-1)
 Larry Stegent, Texas A&M (AP-1)

Fullbacks
 Ross Montgomery, TCU (AP-1)

Ends
 Jerry LeVias, SMU (AP-1) (CFHOF)
 Bob Long, Texas A&M (AP-1)

Tackles
 Ernie Ruple, Arkansas (AP-1)
 Leland Winston, Rice (AP-1)

Guards
 Danny Abbott, Texas (AP-1)
 Phil Tucker, Texas Tech (AP-1)

Centers
 Jerry Turner, Texas Tech (AP-1)

Defense

Defensive ends
 Grady Allen, Texas A&M (AP-1)
 Jay Collins, Rice (AP-1)
 Hartford Hamilton, Arkansas (AP-1)

Defensive tackles
 Greg Pipes, Baylor (AP-1)
 Danny Cross, TCU (AP-1)

Defensive guards
 David Cooper, Arkansas (AP-1)
 Loyd Wainscott, Texas (AP-1)

Linebackers
 Bill Hobbs, Texas A&M (AP-1)
 Ed Mooney, Texas Tech (AP-1)

Defensive halfbacks
 Tommy Trantham, Arkansas (AP-1)
 Hugo Hollas, Rice (AP-1)

Safeties
 Bubby Hudler, TCU (AP-1)

Key
AP = Associated Press

CFHOF = Player inducted into the College Football Hall of Fame

See also
1967 College Football All-America Team

References

All-Southwest Conference
All-Southwest Conference football teams